Grey High School is a boys' school in Port Elizabeth, South Africa.

Grey High School may also refer to:

 Grey High School (California), a continuation school in the Los Angeles Unified School District
 Point Grey Secondary School, Vancouver, British Columbia, Canada

See also
 Grey College (disambiguation)
 Gray High School (disambiguation)